(also known as ) is an Atira asteroid, a type of Aten asteroid, that orbits entirely within Earth's orbit. It orbits very close to the Sun, having the eighth smallest semi-major axis of any minor planet in the Solar System. At its closest, it is only  from the Sun, but more than 100 minor planets have a smaller perihelion distance.

Despite being officially classified as a near-Earth object,  has a MOID (minimum orbit intersection distance) with Earth of ~0.067 AU, making it highly unlikely to ever hit Earth. For comparison, the Moon orbits Earth at about 1/26th this distance.

Physical characteristics
 has an absolute magnitude (H) of 20.1, which means it is rather small, with the size being approximately 300 meters based on an assumed albedo of 0.15. Its albedo is not known, so a size estimate is not certain. Assuming the albedo is between 0.05 and 0.25, it is somewhere between 260–580 meters in diameter.

Close approaches
As a near-Earth object,  often comes within ] of Earth. On 29 April 2014, it traveled to 0.0843 AU from Earth, about 33 times further than the Moon. Below is a list of close approaches until 2100 where  travels closer than 0.1 AU to Earth.

References

External links 
 
 
 

Minor planet object articles (unnumbered)
20060525
20130511